The Monterey Peninsula Soccer League  is an adult amateur soccer league featuring teams from Monterey, California and the surrounding areas. The league is an affiliate of the United States Soccer Federation.

History
The Monterey Peninsula Soccer League (MPSL) is a USSF affiliated adult amateur league that was founded in the early 1980s.
Historically, teams from the Monterey Institute of International Studies, the Naval Postgraduate School, Monterey Peninsula College, the Presidio of Monterey and CSU Monterey Bay, along with a number of other local teams have participated in this league.

Organization
The MPSL is affiliated with FIFA through the U.S. Soccer Federation, the United States Adult Soccer Association and the California Soccer Association North (CSAN). All players must be registered for the MPSL through CSAN.
The level of play varies between Division 1 and Division 2 from year-to-year because of the annual turnover caused by the large number of graduate and undergraduate students that play in the MPSL.
Games are officiated under the FIFA Laws of the Game using a center referee and two assistant referees.
Unlimited substitutions are allowed with the center referee's permission on dead balls.

Teams in the MPSL

Active as of 2014
 Central Coast FC
 Monterey Ducks
 MIIS
 NPS Varsity

Former Teams
 Monterey United
 Pacific Grove United "Orcas"
 PG United
 Internacional
 Atlético Español
 Forces United
 MSSC
 African Lions

Champions

Year by year

External links
 MPSL Homepage
 US Soccer Federation

Sports in Monterey County, California
Soccer in California
United States Adult Soccer Association leagues
1984 establishments in California
Sports leagues established in 1984
Regional Soccer leagues in the United States